

The Blanchard BB-1 was a 1920s French racing flying-boat designed and built by Société des Avions Blanchard to compete in Schneider Trophy.

Design and development
The BB-1 was a single-seat parasol-wing monoplane flying-boat powered by a  Gnome-Rhône Jupiter radial piston engine. The BB-1 was tested in 1924 but the performance was poor and the aircraft was not developed further and was scrapped.

Specifications

See also

References

Flying boats
1920s French sport aircraft
Racing aircraft
BB-1
Single-engined tractor aircraft
Parasol-wing aircraft
Aircraft first flown in 1924